Allenville is an unincorporated community located in the town of Vinland, Winnebago County, Wisconsin, United States.

Allenville was named for Timothy Allen, an original owner of the town site.

Notes

Unincorporated communities in Winnebago County, Wisconsin
Unincorporated communities in Wisconsin